Andhra Jateva Kalashala Ground was a cricket ground in Machilipatnam, Andhra Pradesh, India.  The only recorded match held on the ground came in December 1984 when Andhra Pradesh played a first-class match in the 1983/84 Ranji Trophy against Hyderabad, which Hyderabad won by 8 wickets.

References

External links
Andhra Jateva Kalashala Ground at ESPNcricinfo
Andhra Jateva Kalashala Ground at CricketArchive

Cricket grounds in Andhra Pradesh
Buildings and structures in Krishna district
Sports venues completed in 1984
1984 establishments in Andhra Pradesh
20th-century architecture in India